Emerald Beers Wilson (September 10, 1896 – April 3, 1975) was an American football and basketball coach. He served as the head football coach at Defiance College in Defiance, Ohio from 1927 to 1930 and at Hobart and William Smith Colleges in Geneva, New York from 1934 to 1942, compiling a career college football coaching record of 44–41–9. Wilson was also the head basketball coach at Defiance from 1927 to 1931, tallying a mark of 43–30.

References

External links
 

1896 births
1975 deaths
Defiance Yellow Jackets football coaches
Defiance Yellow Jackets men's basketball coaches
Hobart Statesmen football coaches
People from Cardington, Ohio
Basketball coaches from Ohio